Congress Green Cemetery is a historic military cemetery in North Bend, Ohio, near Cincinnati.

The plot was excluded from Symmes Purchase because it was thought to contain mineral deposits. The land was first owned by the family of William Henry Harrison; this is recorded by a historical marker at the cemetery.

Interments include John Cleves Symmes, father-in-law of William Henry Harrison.

The cemetery is located opposite the William Henry Harrison Tomb State Memorial, the resting place of the former president and his wife.

See also
Pioneer Memorial Cemetery, Cincinnati

References

External links
Congress Green Cemetery at Find A Grave

Cemeteries in Hamilton County, Ohio
Protected areas of Hamilton County, Ohio